Mariana Chobanova (born 13 September 1965) is a Bulgarian basketball player. She competed in the women's tournament at the 1988 Summer Olympics.

References

External links
 

1965 births
Living people
Bulgarian women's basketball players
Olympic basketball players of Bulgaria
Basketball players at the 1988 Summer Olympics
Sportspeople from Blagoevgrad